In molecular biology the nematode Her-1 protein is a protein which adopts an all-helical structure with two subdomains: amino acids 19-80 comprise a left-handed three-helix bundle with an overhand connection between the second and third helices, whilst amino acids 81-164 comprise a left-handed anti-parallel four-helix bundle in which the first helix consists of four consecutive turns of 3-10-helix. Fourteen cysteines are conserved in all known HER-1 sequences and form seven disulphide bonds. The protein dictates male development in Caenorhabditis elegans, probably by playing a direct role in cell signalling during C. elegans sex determination. It also inhibits the function of tra-2a.

References

Protein domains